Australian Playboy was an Australian imprint of Playboy magazine, running between 1979 and 2000, during which time 252 issues were published.

Content
In 1979 Kerry Packer's ACP Magazines secured the Australian rights to Playboy magazine.

Australian Playboy featured similar content to the lead US edition, and included interviews, feature articles and entertainment reviews. The magazine would rely heavily on the US edition for pictorials, and thus reprinted many pictorials featuring popular US Playmates and celebrities including Pamela Anderson, Erika Eleniak and Anna Nicole Smith.

An Australian Playmate of the Year would be crowned annually.

The first edition issued February 1979, featured Rosemary Paul on the cover and Karen Pini as the centerfold, selling nearly 200,000 copies.

In 1982 Packer sold the rights to Mason Stewart Publishing, publishers of surfing magazine, Tracks, and rock music magazine, RAM. Sales settled at around 140,000.

The biggest selling edition of Australian Playboy was the October 1995 issue with Dannii Minogue on the cover and Cynthia Brown as the centerfold.

By 1996 sales of the magazine had fallen to 36,000 and in 1997 Mason Stewart Publishing was taken over by British publisher EMAP International Limited, with Philip Mason becoming non-executive chairman of EMAP Australia.

Due to declining sales (circulation - 25,000), the last issue was January 2000, which featured Elina Giani on the cover and Jodi Ann Paterson as the centerfold.

Notable Australian celebrities who have appeared on the cover or in the magazine include:

 Rachel Hunter: supermodel (New Zealander)
 Emma Harrison: Neighbours actress - July, 1997
 Melissa George: Home and Away actress - March, 1997
 Dannii Minogue: international popstar and X Factor and Australia's Got Talent judge - October, 1995
 Sophie Lee: actress - July, 1992
 Nicky Love: singer, model - July, 1992
 Fiona Ruttelle: singer, actress - July, 1992
 Fiona Horne: singer, celebrity witch, writer- November, 1998
 Kym Wilson: actress - May, 1999
 Gabrielle Richens:  model, actress, TV presenter - March, 1999
 Kate Ceberano: singer - January, 1989
 Melissa Tkautz: actress - December, 1996
 Wendy Botha: surfer - September, 1992
 Lynda Stoner: actress - May, 1982
 Elle Macpherson: model, actress - August, 1995 & June, 1996
 Rhapsody: a musical duo (Kymberlie Harrison and Cathy Ford) - August, 1993
 Abigail: actress - August, 1980

See also
 Playboy

References

Further reading
 — an early photo-essay on Australian eroticism (as opposed to pornography), featuring Playboy photographer Rico Mettbach. Includes some background into the magazine's readership and editorial history.

External links
Australian Playboy Cover Database
Australian Playboy Covers at PBCovers.com

1979 establishments in Australia
2000 disestablishments in Australia
Men's magazines published in Australia
Defunct magazines published in Australia
Magazines established in 1979
Magazines disestablished in 2000
Playboy magazines
Monthly magazines published in Australia
Magazines published in Melbourne